Alister James Campbell (born 1 January 1959) is a former Scotland international rugby union player.

Rugby Union career

Amateur career

He started out playing for Hawick Linden in 1975.

He played for Hawick from 1976. He played as a Lock.

He captained the side in 1987–88 season.

Provincial career

He played for South of Scotland District.

International career

He was capped by Scotland 'B' 3 times in the period 1983–84.

He received 15 full senior caps for Scotland between 1984 and 1988. He made his debut beating Ireland to win the Triple Crown; two weeks later he was in the side that won the Grand Slam in 1984.

Coaching career

He coached Hawick PSA; and they won the semi-junior league in 1994–95 season.

References

1959 births
Living people
Hawick Linden RFC players
Hawick RFC players
Rugby union players from Hawick
Scotland 'B' international rugby union players
Scotland international rugby union players
Scottish rugby union players
South of Scotland District (rugby union) players
Rugby union locks